Army of Lovers or Revolt of the Perverts  is a 1979 German documentary film directed by Rosa von Praunheim.

For example, the film was shown at the University of California's Berkeley Art Museum and Pacific Film Archive in 1982.

Plot
The film is about the state and development of the LGBT movement in the US after the Stonewall riots of 1969.

Awards
 1979: Nomination for the Gold Hugo at the Chicago International Film Festival

Reception
J. Hoberman wrote in the Village Voice: "Army of Lovers has its own moments of sentimental stridency, but it´s a heartfelt, challenging, and often stirring film that deserves the widest possible audience."

Notes

References 
Kuzniar, Alice. The Queer German Cinema, Stanford University Press, 2000, 
Murray, Raymond. Images in the Dark: An Encyclopedia of Gay and Lesbian Film and Video. TLA Publications, 1994,

External links

1979 films
German LGBT-related films
West German films
Films directed by Rosa von Praunheim
1979 LGBT-related films
Documentary films about gay men
1970s German films